Hypercompe orsa is a moth of the family Erebidae first described by Pieter Cramer in 1777. It is found in Suriname.

The larvae have been recorded feeding on Lantana, Senecio and Sphagneticola species.

References

Hypercompe
Moths described in 1777